Olena Zelenska Foundation is a Ukrainian charitable foundation founded by the First Lady of Ukraine Olena Zelenska and presented on September 22, 2022, in New York City.

History 

The presentation of the Olena Zelenska Foundation took place on September 22, 2022, at a charity evening in New York. The event was attended by former US Secretary of State Hillary Clinton, British Foreign Minister James Cleverly, General Director of the Metropolitan Opera in New York Peter Gelb, American TV presenter and actor Jimmy Fallon, actor Matt Damon, actress Brooke Shields, as well as diplomats and businessmen. Ukrainian pop stars performed at the charity evening. Andriy Bednyakov became the host of the evening.  The President of Ukraine Volodymyr Zelenskyy joined the charity evening in an online format from Kyiv.

Description 

The main goal of the Olena Zelenska Foundation is the restoration of the human capital of Ukraine, as well as the reconstruction of medical and educational institutions. The areas of work are medicine, education and humanitarian aid. The foundation cooperates with foreign and Ukrainian businesses, international agencies and other funds that want to invest in the restoration of Ukraine's human capital.

See also 

United24
Kyiv Summit of First Ladies and Gentlemen
Be Brave Like Ukraine

References

External links 
Official website

2022 Russian invasion of Ukraine
Charities based in Ukraine
2022 establishments in Ukraine